The Lyublino Constituency (No.199) is a Russian legislative constituency in Moscow. It is based in South-Eastern Moscow.

Members elected

Election results

1993

|-
! colspan=2 style="background-color:#E9E9E9;text-align:left;vertical-align:top;" |Candidate
! style="background-color:#E9E9E9;text-align:left;vertical-align:top;" |Party
! style="background-color:#E9E9E9;text-align:right;" |Votes
! style="background-color:#E9E9E9;text-align:right;" |%
|-
|style="background-color:#0085BE"|
|align=left|Boris Fyodorov
|align=left|Choice of Russia
|55,019
|23.83%
|-
|style="background-color:"|
|align=left|Vadim Artemyev
|align=left|Independent
| -
|13.13%
|-
| colspan="5" style="background-color:#E9E9E9;"|
|- style="font-weight:bold"
| colspan="3" style="text-align:left;" | Total
| 230,834
| 100%
|-
| colspan="5" style="background-color:#E9E9E9;"|
|- style="font-weight:bold"
| colspan="4" |Source:
|
|}

1995

|-
! colspan=2 style="background-color:#E9E9E9;text-align:left;vertical-align:top;" |Candidate
! style="background-color:#E9E9E9;text-align:left;vertical-align:top;" |Party
! style="background-color:#E9E9E9;text-align:right;" |Votes
! style="background-color:#E9E9E9;text-align:right;" |%
|-
|style="background-color:#1C1A0D"|
|align=left|Boris Fyodorov (incumbent)
|align=left|Forward, Russia!
|70,472
|24.27%
|-
|style="background-color:#295EC4"|
|align=left|Sergey Kurochkin
|align=left|Party of Economic Freedom
|36,127
|12.44%
|-
|style="background-color:#C28314"|
|align=left|Vladimir Kostyuchenko
|align=left|For the Motherland!
|28,183
|9.70%
|-
|style="background-color:"|
|align=left|Yury Nazarov
|align=left|Communist Party
|27,067
|9.32%
|-
|style="background-color:"|
|align=left|Klara Luchko
|align=left|Agrarian Party
|17,591
|6.06%
|-
|style="background-color:#FE4801"|
|align=left|Valery Lysenko
|align=left|Pamfilova–Gurov–Lysenko
|15,222
|5.24%
|-
|style="background-color:"|
|align=left|Igor Petrenko
|align=left|Independent
|12,493
|4.30%
|-
|style="background-color:"|
|align=left|Sergey Maslennikov
|align=left|Independent
|10,686
|3.68%
|-
|style="background-color:#F21A29"|
|align=left|Viktor Vdovin
|align=left|Trade Unions and Industrialists – Union of Labour
|8,072
|2.78%
|-
|style="background-color:#D50000"|
|align=left|Vasily Galepa
|align=left|Communists and Working Russia - for the Soviet Union
|5,856
|2.02%
|-
|style="background-color:"|
|align=left|Sergey Plekhanov
|align=left|Liberal Democratic Party
|5,213
|1.80%
|-
|style="background-color:#959698"|
|align=left|Tamara Samartseva
|align=left|Derzhava
|4,171
|1.44%
|-
|style="background-color:"|
|align=left|Dmitry Biryukov
|align=left|Revival
|3,388
|1.17%
|-
|style="background-color:"|
|align=left|Valery Pashintsev
|align=left|Independent
|2,848
|0.98%
|-
|style="background-color:#000000"|
|colspan=2 |against all
|35,886
|12.36%
|-
| colspan="5" style="background-color:#E9E9E9;"|
|- style="font-weight:bold"
| colspan="3" style="text-align:left;" | Total
| 290,397
| 100%
|-
| colspan="5" style="background-color:#E9E9E9;"|
|- style="font-weight:bold"
| colspan="4" |Source:
|
|}

1998
The results of the by-election were invalidated due to low turnout, another by-election was not scheduled as 1999 federal election was due to be held in less than a year.

|-
! colspan=2 style="background-color:#E9E9E9;text-align:left;vertical-align:top;" |Candidate
! style="background-color:#E9E9E9;text-align:left;vertical-align:top;" |Party
! style="background-color:#E9E9E9;text-align:right;" |Votes
! style="background-color:#E9E9E9;text-align:right;" |%
|-
|style="background-color:"|
|align=left|Pavel Voshchanov
|align=left|Independent
|33,072
|26.21%
|-
| colspan="5" style="background-color:#E9E9E9;"|
|- style="font-weight:bold"
| colspan="3" style="text-align:left;" | Total
| 126,181
| 100%
|-
| colspan="5" style="background-color:#E9E9E9;"|
|- style="font-weight:bold"
| colspan="4" |Source:
|
|}

1999

|-
! colspan=2 style="background-color:#E9E9E9;text-align:left;vertical-align:top;" |Candidate
! style="background-color:#E9E9E9;text-align:left;vertical-align:top;" |Party
! style="background-color:#E9E9E9;text-align:right;" |Votes
! style="background-color:#E9E9E9;text-align:right;" |%
|-
|style="background-color:#3B9EDF"|
|align=left|Igor Lisinenko
|align=left|Fatherland – All Russia
|101,131
|29.66%
|-
|style="background-color:"|
|align=left|Nikolay Leonov
|align=left|Russian All-People's Union
|46,406
|13.61%
|-
|style="background-color:"|
|align=left|Yelena Panina
|align=left|Independent
|41,733
|12.24%
|-
|style="background-color:"|
|align=left|Pavel Voshchanov
|align=left|Yabloko
|38,606
|11.32%
|-
|style="background-color:"|
|align=left|Aleksey Aleksandrov
|align=left|Independent
|25,327
|7.43%
|-
|style="background-color:"|
|align=left|Vilenina Golitsyna
|align=left|Liberal Democratic Party
|5,788
|1.70%
|-
|style="background-color:"|
|align=left|Lilia Adarcheva
|align=left|Independent
|5,473
|1.61%
|-
|style="background-color:#7C273A"|
|align=left|Aleksey Nosov
|align=left|Movement in Support of the Army
|5,400
|1.58%
|-
|style="background-color:"|
|align=left|Mikhail Ilyin
|align=left|Independent
|4,895
|1.44%
|-
|style="background-color:#FF4400"|
|align=left|Anatoly Vedenin
|align=left|Andrey Nikolayev and Svyatoslav Fyodorov Bloc
|4,489
|1.32%
|-
|style="background-color:#FCCA19"|
|align=left|Vladimir Ozhogov
|align=left|Congress of Russian Communities-Yury Boldyrev Movement
|3,739
|1.10%
|-
|style="background-color:#084284"|
|align=left|Vyacheslav Makarov
|align=left|Spiritual Heritage
|1,835
|0.54%
|-
|style="background-color:#000000"|
|colspan=2 |against all
|46,650
|13.68%
|-
| colspan="5" style="background-color:#E9E9E9;"|
|- style="font-weight:bold"
| colspan="3" style="text-align:left;" | Total
| 340,947
| 100%
|-
| colspan="5" style="background-color:#E9E9E9;"|
|- style="font-weight:bold"
| colspan="4" |Source:
|
|}

2003

|-
! colspan=2 style="background-color:#E9E9E9;text-align:left;vertical-align:top;" |Candidate
! style="background-color:#E9E9E9;text-align:left;vertical-align:top;" |Party
! style="background-color:#E9E9E9;text-align:right;" |Votes
! style="background-color:#E9E9E9;text-align:right;" |%
|-
|style="background-color:"|
|align=left|Yelena Panina
|align=left|United Russia
|103,160
|38.32%
|-
|style="background-color:#004090"|
|align=left|Boris Fyodorov
|align=left|New Course — Automobile Russia
|35,309
|13.12%
|-
|style="background-color:#00A1FF"|
|align=left|Aleksandr Shabalov
|align=left|Party of Russia's Rebirth-Russian Party of Life
|27,838
|10.34%
|-
|style="background-color:"|
|align=left|Yury Politukhin
|align=left|Communist Party
|15,907
|5.91%
|-
|style="background-color:#CACBFB"|
|align=left|Vyacheslav Igrunov
|align=left|Union of People for Education and Science
|12,286
|4.56%
|-
|style="background-color:"|
|align=left|Yury Kokarev
|align=left|Independent
|6,722
|2.50%
|-
|style="background-color:"|
|align=left|Sergey Abeltsev
|align=left|Liberal Democratic Party
|5,292
|1.97%
|-
|style="background-color:"|
|align=left|Andrey Priyatkin
|align=left|Independent
|2,693
|1.00%
|-
|style="background-color:#000000"|
|colspan=2 |against all
|52,986
|19.68%
|-
| colspan="5" style="background-color:#E9E9E9;"|
|- style="font-weight:bold"
| colspan="3" style="text-align:left;" | Total
| 270,744
| 100%
|-
| colspan="5" style="background-color:#E9E9E9;"|
|- style="font-weight:bold"
| colspan="4" |Source:
|
|}

2016

|-
! colspan=2 style="background-color:#E9E9E9;text-align:left;vertical-align:top;" |Candidate
! style="background-color:#E9E9E9;text-align:left;vertical-align:top;" |Party
! style="background-color:#E9E9E9;text-align:right;" |Votes
! style="background-color:#E9E9E9;text-align:right;" |%
|-
|style="background-color:"|
|align=left|Pyotr Tolstoy
|align=left|United Russia
|82,346
|49.07%
|-
|style="background-color:"|
|align=left|Valery Rashkin
|align=left|Communist Party
|20,979
|12.50%
|-
|style="background-color:"|
|align=left|Valery Kozadaev
|align=left|Liberal Democratic Party
|12,052
|7.18%
|-
|style="background-color:"|
|align=left|Valery Katkov
|align=left|A Just Russia
|11,436
|6.81%
|-
|style="background-color:"|
|align=left|Vladimir Semago
|align=left|Yabloko
|8,892
|5.30%
|-
|style="background:"| 
|align=left|Vladimir Markin
|align=left|Patriots of Russia
|5,946
|3.54%
|-
|style="background:;"| 
|align=left|Fyodor Biryukov
|align=left|Rodina
|5,697
|3.39%
|-
|style="background:;"| 
|align=left|Dmitry Kachanovsky
|align=left|People's Freedom Party
|4,428
|2.64%
|-
|style="background:;"| 
|align=left|Aleksandr Kuvaev
|align=left|Communists of Russia
|4,343
|2.59%
|-
|style="background:;"| 
|align=left|Mikhail Dolmatov
|align=left|Party of Growth
|4,041
|2.41%
|-
|style="background:;"| 
|align=left|Aleksandr Kachanov
|align=left|Civic Platform
|1,772
|1.06%
|-
|style="background:#00A650;"| 
|align=left|Mikhail Kozulin
|align=left|Civilian Power
|613
|0.37%
|-
| colspan="5" style="background-color:#E9E9E9;"|
|- style="font-weight:bold"
| colspan="3" style="text-align:left;" | Total
| 167,818
| 100%
|-
| colspan="5" style="background-color:#E9E9E9;"|
|- style="font-weight:bold"
| colspan="4" |Source:
|
|}

2021

|-
! colspan=2 style="background-color:#E9E9E9;text-align:left;vertical-align:top;" |Candidate
! style="background-color:#E9E9E9;text-align:left;vertical-align:top;" |Party
! style="background-color:#E9E9E9;text-align:right;" |Votes
! style="background-color:#E9E9E9;text-align:right;" |%
|-
|style="background-color: " |
|align=left|Pyotr Tolstoy (incumbent)
|align=left|United Russia
|115,457
|45.91%
|-
|style="background-color: " |
|align=left|Yelena Gulicheva
|align=left|Communist Party
|49,472
|19.67%
|-
|style="background-color: "|
|align=left|Maria Prokhorenkova
|align=left|New People
|12,801
|5.09%
|-
|style="background-color: "|
|align=left|Ivan Kulnev
|align=left|A Just Russia — For Truth
|12,080
|4.80%
|-
|style="background-color: " |
|align=left|Valery Rashkin
|align=left|Communists of Russia
|10,343
|4.11%
|-
|style="background-color: "|
|align=left|Anna Balykova
|align=left|Party of Pensioners
|8,985
|3.57%
|-
|style="background-color: " |
|align=left|Andrey Shakh
|align=left|Liberal Democratic Party
|8,786
|3.49%
|-
|style="background-color: " |
|align=left|Valery Katkov
|align=left|Party of Growth
|7,722
|3.07%
|-
|style="background-color: "|
|align=left|Vladimir Badmaev
|align=left|Russian Party of Freedom and Justice
|6,204
|2.47%
|-
|style="background-color: " |
|align=left|Roman Kisilyov
|align=left|Yabloko
|5,826
|2.32%
|-
|style="background: ;"| 
|align=left|Samson Sholademi
|align=left|The Greens
|4,533
|1.80%
|-
|style="background: ;"| 
|align=left|Zinaida Gulina
|align=left|Green Alternative
|3,059
|1.22%
|-
|style="background: ;"| 
|align=left|Denis Tarasov
|align=left|Civic Platform
|2,434
|0.97%
|-
| colspan="5" style="background-color:#E9E9E9;"|
|- style="font-weight:bold"
| colspan="3" style="text-align:left;" | Total
| 251,499
| 100%
|-
| colspan="5" style="background-color:#E9E9E9;"|
|- style="font-weight:bold"
| colspan="4" |Source:
|
|}

Notes

Sources
199. Люблинский одномандатный избирательный округ

References

Russian legislative constituencies
Politics of Moscow